eXist-db (or eXist for short) is an open source software project for NoSQL databases built on XML technology. It is classified as both a NoSQL document-oriented database system and a native XML database (and it provides support for XML, JSON, HTML and Binary documents). Unlike most relational database management systems (RDBMS) and NoSQL databases, eXist-db provides XQuery and XSLT as its query and application programming languages.

eXist-db is released under version 2.1 of the GNU LGPL.

Features
eXist-db allows software developers to persist XML/JSON/Binary documents without writing extensive middleware.  eXist-db follows and extends many W3C XML standards such as XQuery.  eXist-db also supports REST interfaces for interfacing with AJAX-type web forms.  Applications such as XForms may save their data by using just a few lines of code.  The WebDAV interface to eXist-db allows users to "drag and drop" XML files directly into the eXist-db database.  eXist-db automatically indexes documents using a keyword indexing system.

History
eXist-db was created in 2000 by Wolfgang Meier.

eXist-db was awarded the best XML database of the year by InfoWorld in 2006.

The companies eXist Solutions GmbH in Germany, and Evolved Binary in the UK, promote and provide support for the software.

There is an O'Reilly book for eXist-db which is co-authored by Adam Retter and Erik Siegel.

Supported standards and technologies
eXist-db has support for the following standards and technologies:
 XPath - XML Path language
 XQuery - XML Query language
 XSLT - Extensible Stylesheet Language Transformations
 XSL-FO - XSL Formatting Objects
 WebDAV - Web distributed authoring and versioning
 REST - Representational state transfer (URL encoding)
 RESTXQ - RESTful annotations for XQuery
 XInclude - server-side include file processing (limited support)
 XML-RPC - a remote procedure call protocol
 XProc - a XML Pipeline processing language
 XQuery API for Java

See also 

 BaseX - another Open Source Native XML Database
 CouchDB - a document-oriented database based on JSON

References

External links
 

Free database management systems
XML databases
Software using the LGPL license
Database-related software for Linux
Free software programmed in Java (programming language)